The Gate of the Ears (Spanish: Arco de las Orejas), also known as the Arc of the Ears or Bib-Arrambla Gate, was a city gate of Granada (Andalusia, Spain). Built in the 11th or 12th century, it stood at the corner of Plaza de Bib-Rambla and Calle Salamanca. During the 19th century, the gate became the subject of several major controversies, and in 1884 it was demolished.

According to documents in the city court archives, there was another gate nearby called the Puerta Real. To discourage criminal activity, decapitated heads were hung on the gates of Arc of Elvira. In 1935, Torres Balbás used the remains of the Gate of the Ears to create an arch in the park of the Alhambra. This arch and a small gate at the beginning of Plaza de Bib-Rambla are the only vestiges of the old gate.

Etymology
One popular theory suggests that the gate's name is linked to the Andalusian tradition of taking the ears (and other body parts) of executed criminals and hanging them for display. Another theory suggests that during the reign of Philip IV of Spain, a floating tablao carrying too many people had sunk. The ears of dead women were mutilated in an effort to remove their earrings, giving the Gate of the Ears its name.  

The Gate of the Ears was known by many different names throughout history, such as the Arc of the Ears, Bib-Arrambla Gate, Gate of the Hands, Gate of the Pesos, Gate of the Horse, and Gate of the Sandland. The name Gate of the Sandland appeared during Moorish era because the sand lands of the nearby Darro River were the site of horse races. During this era, the gate was known as Bab-Al-Rambla, which would become the name of the plaza. It was also known as the Gate of the Knives, which may be related to the placement of confiscated knives.

History
According to recent studies, the gate was constructed in the 11th or 12th century. It appears to have inspired similar structures, such as the 14th-century Gate of Justice (Yusuf I). The similarity between the two caused some authors to wrongly date the Gate of the Ears to the Nasrid period.

Topped by a tower 10 or 11 meters high, the Gate of the Ears was a monumental gate heavily protected by the square tower and three arches. The exterior had a large horseshoe arch, made with voussoirs of stone from Sierra Elvira. The structure was crowned by a balcony where, according to legend, the ears of criminals were nailed. The gate also had a machicolation, closed in 1507, forming what would become a chapel. As it was not primarily a military or defensive building, it had a more elegant line (as described in History of Granada by Juan Gay Armenteros and Cristina Viñes Millet). There was an open space inside for defending the entrance. The smaller arch on the opposite side had sunken and embossed voussoirs, very similar to those on the Gate of Justice in the Alhambra, which made some historians assume that this arch was built in the mid-14th century.

During both the Moorish and Spanish eras, the gate was the only entrance to Plaza de Bib-Rambla, which was surrounded by city walls.

A Catholic Monarch hung a painting on the second arch: Our Lady of the Rose, named after the flower that the child is holding. Its sides are decorated with the initials of the kings. The kings may have placed the canvas there during one of their visits to the city. A grandstand was also installed under the voussoirs of the first arc in 1507. The chapel was closed and left a hole that exposed the image of the Virgin to the plaza. This was common in many Spanish gates that contained such paintings. The purpose was to Christianize the main elements of Muslim architecture and show visitors the new religion of the newly conquered city. Originally, the painting followed the schemes of the late Spanish-Flemish school. Its Gothicism is most noticeable in the angels, smaller in size and with angular wings. By contrast, the faces of the Virgin and Child favored greater naturalism and remarkable sweetness.

In 1675, a tribune and an altar were added, hiding some of the original decoration. On the side of the plaza, Gothic characters were printed on a white marble board, alluding to a chapel above, which was built in 1507 in honor of the fiestas of the Corpus Christi by the chaplain of Queen Isabella I of Castile. It seems that the Mass was held in the chapel for the neighborhood of the plaza and the Zacatín.

Demolition

By 1873, the Gate of the Ears was in poor condition and the city council of Granada deemed it ruinous. Businessmen and burghers of Granada put pressure on the city to demolish it, arguing that the gate hindered the city's economic development and prosperity. Initiatives such as the Ensanches/Eixamples reinforced this position and underscored the congestion and stagnation caused by the gate. The city council shortly announced plans for its demolition.

The decision caused such an uproar that the president of the First Republic demanded its renovation, stating that "it would be a shame for Granada and a disgrace to the Republic, since the monuments of Granada are the heritage of the human race." A city council architect, Díaz Losada, also announced his opposition to the destruction, arguing that the gate was not in ruins and only required repair. After March 27, 1879, the city council architects issued a report stating that there was no other option but to dismantle the elements of the Gate of Ears so that it could be restored later. Madrid's answer to the report was clear: in 1881, the structure was declared a national monument and came under the protection of the state.

However, Granada received many complaints in response to the decree. Some claimed that the gate was a danger to public health and safety due to urbanization and the dangerous cracks weakening the gate's structure. In the summer of 1884, the fear of a cholera epidemic further raised concerns about the monument's lack of cleanliness, finally leading to its demolition, which began on September 3, 1884.

Remains
Leopoldo Torres Balbás, a conservative architect of the Alhambra, tried to rebuild the gate in 1933 with the original remains, placing a new arc in its current location. Unfortunately, many of its original features were lost. Balbás was able to construct an edifice from what was left, which is located in the Forest of the Alhambra, partially hidden by foliage and trees.

See also
List of missing landmarks in Spain

References

External links

Granada
Demolished buildings and structures in Spain
Moorish architecture in Spain
Buildings and structures completed in the 12th century
City gates in Spain
Virgin Mary in art
Former gates
Buildings and structures demolished in 1894